The Oldsmobile V8, also referred to as the Rocket, is series of engines that was produced by Oldsmobile from 1949 until 1990. The Rocket, along with the 1949 Cadillac V8, were the first post-war OHV crossflow cylinder head V8 engines produced by General Motors. Like all other GM divisions, Olds continued building its own V8 engine family for decades, adopting the corporate Chevrolet 350 small-block and Cadillac Northstar engine only in the 1990s. All Oldsmobile V8s were manufactured at plants in Lansing, Michigan while the engine block and cylinder heads were cast at Saginaw Metal Casting Operations.

These taller-deck models are commonly called "big-blocks", and are  taller and  wider than their "small-block" counterparts.

The Rocket V8 was the subject of many first and lasts in the automotive industry. It was the first mass-produced OHV V8, in 1949.

The factory painted "small-blocks" gold or blue (flat black on the late model ), while "big-blocks" could be red, green, blue, or bronze.

As is the case with all pre-1972 American passenger car engines, published horsepower and torque figures for those years were SAE "Gross," as opposed to 1972 and later SAE Net ratings (which are indicative of what actual production engines produce in their "as installed" state - with all engine accessories, full air cleaner assembly, and complete production exhaust system in place).

Northway sourced Oldsmobile Flathead V8 (1916-1923)
The first Oldsmobile V8 was of a flathead design that was developed by Northway Engine Works before GM assumed operations. It was installed in the Oldsmobile Light Eight and was related to the Cadillac flathead V8 engine.  In 1929, Oldsmobile installed a 90 degree monobloc flathead V8 engine in the Viking companion brand before the monobloc was used in LaSalle and Cadillac vehicles from 1929-1931.

Generation I

The first generation of Oldsmobile V8s ranged from 1949-1964. Each engine in this generation is quite similar with the same size block and heads.

303

The  engine had hydraulic lifters, an oversquare bore:stroke ratio, a counterweighted forged crankshaft, aluminum pistons, floating wristpins, and a dual-plane intake manifold. The 303 was produced from 1949-1953. Cadillac used a distantly related engine which appeared in three different sizes through to the 1962 model year; though the Oldsmobile and Cadillac motors were not physically related, many lessons learned by one division were incorporated into the other's design, and the result were two engines known for their excellent power-to-weight ratio, fuel economy, and smooth, strong, reliable running.

The original Oldsmobile V8 was to have been marketed as "Kettering Power" after chief engineer Charles Kettering, but company policy prohibited the use of his name. Instead, influenced by the Space Race between the United States and the USSR, the legendary Rocket was born, available in Oldsmobile's 88, Super 88, and 98 models.  The engine proved so popular, the division's 88 models were popularly called Rocket 88s.

The 303 was available from 1949 until 1953.

Applications:
1949–1953 Oldsmobile 88
1949–1953 Oldsmobile 98
1952–1953 Oldsmobile Super 88

324

The  version was produced from 1954 until 1956. Two-barrel carburetion was standard; all high performance 324s came with four-barrel carburetors. The 324 was shared with GMC trucks.

For engines built during the first part of 1955, the 324 skirted pistons had a reputation for failing due to the cast aluminum skirt separating from its steel interior brace. By late 1956, many Olds dealers learned about the problem.

Applications:
1954–1956 Oldsmobile 88
1954–1956 Oldsmobile Super 88
1954–1956 Oldsmobile 98

371

Making its debut in 1957 as standard equipment on all Olds models, the 371 was produced through 1960. It was no longer available in cars in 1961.

This engine was used in GMC heavy trucks as the "370" of 232 gross HP at 4200 RPM and torque 355 gross lbs-ft at 2600 RPM from 1957 to 1959.It had hardened valve seats and other features for heavy duty usage.

Applications:
1957–1960 Oldsmobile 88
1957–1958 Oldsmobile Super 88
1957–1958 Oldsmobile 98

J-2 Golden Rocket
Introduced in the middle of the 1957 model year, the 1957 and 1958 J-2 Golden Rocket had three two-barrel (twin choke) carburetors with a vacuum-operated linkage. Only the center carburetor was mechanically connected to the throttle pedal, and it was the only one equipped with a choke. When the center carburetor was opened to 60° or more engine vacuum drawn from the windshield wiper pump would simultaneously open the front and rear carburetors. These carburetors did not open progressively; they were either open or closed. The J-2 engine also had a slightly thinner head gasket, raising compression to 10.0:1. Oldsmobile charged $83 for the J-2 option with the three-speed manual (or in the 98), $314 dollars with the automatic.

In practice, owners who did not regularly drive hard enough to engage the front and rear carburetors experienced problems with the linkage and carburetor throats becoming clogged, and some J-2-equipped cars had the front and rear carburetors removed and blocked off. Moreover, correct tuning was a continual headache. The package was expensive to produce, and Oldsmobile discontinued it after 1958.

394
Most 394s used 2-barrel carburetors, but special high-compression 4-barrel versions were available starting in 1961. 

Power for the base engine was up to 315 hp (235 kW), even though compression was down a quarter point, to 9.75:1.

The 394 replaced the 371 in Super 88 and 98 cars for 1959 and 1960 and a detuned version was used in the 88 for 1961 and the Dynamic 88 for 1962-1964.

Applications:
1959–1960 Oldsmobile Super 88,  and 
1959–1960 Oldsmobile 98,  and 
1961 Oldsmobile 88,  and 
1962–1964 Oldsmobile Dynamic 88,  and 
1964 Oldsmobile Jetstar I,  and

Sky Rocket
The 1961 through 1963 Sky Rocket (and 1964 Rocket) was a high-compression, four-barrel  engine.

Applications:
1961–1963 Oldsmobile Dynamic 88 (option)
1961–1964 Oldsmobile Super 88 (standard)
1961–1964 Oldsmobile 98 (standard)

Starfire
It was optional on 1964 98s and Super 88s.

Aluminum 215 
From 1961-1963, Oldsmobile manufactured its own version of the Buick-designed, all-aluminum 215 cubic inch (3.5L) V8 engine for the F-85 compact. The Oldsmobile engine was very similar to the Buick engine, but not identical: it had larger wedge combustion chambers with flat-topped (rather than domed) pistons, six bolts rather than five per cylinder, and slightly larger intake valves; the valves were actuated by shaft-mounted rocker arms like the Buick and Pontiac versions, but the shafts and rockers were unique to Oldsmobile. The Buick version was rated at 200 hp with an 11:1 compression ratio.

The Buick version of the 215 V8 went on to become the well known Rover V8, which still remains in limited production, utilizing the Buick-style pistons, heads, and valve train gear.

The Oldsmobile engine block formed the basis of the Repco 3-liter engine used by Brabham to win the 1966 and 1967 Formula One world championships. The 1967 and later versions of the Repco engine had proprietary engine blocks.

It could also be fitted with high-compression cylinder heads from the Morgan +8.

Turbo-Rocket

In 1962 and 1963 Oldsmobile built a turbocharged version of the 215, designated Turbo-Rocket. The turbocharger fitted to the V8 engine was a small-diameter Garrett T5 model with integral wastegate, manufactured by Garrett AiResearch, and produced a maximum of 5 psi (34 kPa) boost at 2200 rpm. The engine had 10.25:1 compression and a single-barrel carburetor. In development, the high compression ratio combined with the charged load created problems with spark knock on hard throttle applications, which led Olds to develop and utilize a novel water-injection system that sprayed metered amounts of distilled water and methyl alcohol (dubbed "Turbo-Rocket Fluid") into the intake manifold air-stream to cool the intake charge. If the fluid reservoir was empty, a complex double-float and valve assembly in the Turbo-Rocket Fluid path would set a second butterfly (positioned between the throttle butterfly and the turbocharger) into the closed position, limiting the amount of boost pressure. Many customers did not keep the reservoir filled, or had mechanical problems with the turbocharger system which resulted in many of the turbo-charger installations being removed and a conventional 4 barrel carburetor and manifold installed in its place.

The Turbo-Rocket V8 was offered exclusively on the Oldsmobile Jetfire, a special version of the Cutlass compact hardtop coupe, which is noteworthy as it is one of the world's first (in fact the second) turbocharged passenger car ever offered for public sale. The Chevrolet Corvair Spyder Turbo, likewise a forced induction i.e turbo-powered car, predated the Oldsmobile Jetfire Turbo, however by only a few weeks, thus being the world's very first turbocharged commercially sold vehicle.

Generation II

The second generation of Oldsmobile V8s was produced from 1964-1990.

These were wedge-head engines with a unique combustion chamber that resulted from a valve angle of only 6°. This was much flatter than the 23° of the small-block Chevrolet and 20° of the Ford small-block wedge heads. This very open and flat chamber was fuel efficient and had lower than average emissions output. It was the only GM engine to meet US emission standards using a carburetor all the way up to 1990.

330
The first second-generation Oldmobile V8  "Jetfire Rocket" introduced in 1964 and produced through 1967. The 4 barrel versions had a larger diameter harmonic damper, the 2 barrel only a balancer hub without the rubberized outer ring.

400
The  version was the second tall-deck "big-block" Olds. Two distinct versions of the 400 CID engine were made:
All the pre-1968 engines used a forged steel crankshaft.

1968 and 1969 400s shared the Olds big-block standard  stroke with the 455 but used a undersquare  bore to comply with GM's displacement restrictions in the A-body cars while also reducing tooling costs. This "later" 400 is considered less desirable by many enthusiasts, because of the power band characteristics induced by this undersquare format, although the actual change in power was due to the mild 250/264 duration cam used in this engine (previous 400s used a 278/282 cam) and the fact that the crankshafts were now made of less durable high nodular iron material.

"Early 400s" used the same forged steel crankshaft as the 425, while "later 400s" used the same cast iron crankshaft of the 455, with rare exceptions; some 1968 and later Olds 400/455s were produced with forged steel crankshafts. These rare cranks can be readily spotted by the "J" shaped notch in the OD of the rear flange; cast iron cranks have a "C" shaped notch. All 1965-1969 Olds 400s were painted bronze.

4-4-2 Rocket
The 1966-1967 4-4-2  V8 was a short stroke engine which featured B and C cast large-valve cylinder heads and hydraulic lifters of larger diameter, as well as push-rods of different length and diameter than the standard Olds Rocket V8. A nominal 360 hp was claimed in 1967 when equipped with a W30 camshaft, 4-barrel, and outside air induction, 502 of which were factory produced. They were all painted Bronze and had V and G stamped on the cylinder heads.

425
The  big-block was the first tall-deck "big block," produced from 1965 through 1967. It is arguably the best engine Olds made in the muscle car era, although it never made it into a "muscle car". It used a  bore and  stroke. Most 425s were painted red, though the 1966 and 1967 Toronado units were light blue. All 425 engines were fitted with forged steel crankshafts with harmonic balancers.

Super Rocket
The standard 1965-1967  was called the Super Rocket, and was the most powerful engine option for the Oldsmobile 88 and 98 of 1965-1967.

Starfire
A special 1965-1967  V8 was the Starfire engine. The main distinguishing features of this engine were a slightly different camshaft profile from the standard ultra high compression engine and factory dual exhaust. This engine was only available in the Oldsmobile Starfire and a performance economy model called the Jetstar I. It shared the same compression ratio of the Toronado Rocket at 10.5:1. It also used the .921 in lifter bore size of the Toronado Rocket.

Toronado Rocket

An Ultra High Compression Toronado Rocket version of the  V8 was made for the 1966 Toronado. It had the same -diameter lifters of the first-generation Oldsmobile engines, rather than the standard , which let engineers increase the camshaft's ramp speed for more power, without sacrificing idle or reliability. Unlike all other 425s, this version was painted slate blue metallic.

455

Initially the paint was red, except for metallic blue in the Toronado applications; 1970-1976 versions were metallic blue at first, then nonmetallic blue. The "Rocket" name disappeared from the air cleaner identification decal after 1974. Although production of the 455 ended in 1976, a small number were produced through 1978 for power equipment use, such as motorhomes, boats and irrigation equipment.

Applications:
Oldsmobile Cutlass
Oldsmobile Vista Cruiser (1970–76)
Oldsmobile Custom Cruiser
Oldsmobile 4-4-2
Oldsmobile Hurst/Olds, 
Oldsmobile 88
Oldsmobile 98
1968–1970 Oldsmobile Toronado, 
1968–1970 Oldsmobile Toronado GT (W34), 
1973–1976 GMC Motorhome

350
Produced from 1968–1980, the Rocket 350 was entirely different from the other GM divisions' 350s. Output ranged from 160-325 hp (119-242 kW). 1968-1974 350s were painted gold; 1975-1976 350s were metallic blue like the 455; 1977-1980 models were painted GM Corporate Blue. The "Rocket" name disappeared from the air cleaner decal in 1975, the same year that the catalytic converter was added to the emissions control system. 

The Oldsmobile 350s made from 1968-1976 have heavy castings, beefier crankshafts, and better flowing heads. The 1977-1980 350s have lighter castings, including a thinner block with large "windows" in the main bearing bulkheads, and have crack-prone cylinder head castings manufactured by Pontiac Motor Division (castings are marked "PMD"; these heads were also used on the 260), and a lightened crankshaft..

The 1976-1979 Cadillac Seville was equipped with a version of this engine featuring an analog Bendix/Bosch electronic port fuel injection system, making this the first American mass-produced car with EFI as standard equipment.

Applications:
1976-1979 Cadillac Seville
1980 Cadillac Seville
1979 Cadillac Eldorado 
1968-1977 Oldsmobile Cutlass
1968–1977 Oldsmobile Vista Cruiser 
1973-1977 Oldsmobile 4-4-2
1968-1980 Oldsmobile Delta 88
1977-1980 Oldsmobile 98
1979-1981 Oldsmobile Toronado
1973-1979 Oldsmobile Omega

L34
Oldsmobile's own L34  V8 was used in the 1976 Oldsmobile Cutlass "S", 1979 Hurst/Olds models and 1980 "4-4-2".

403
The 455 big block Olds V8 was replaced in 1977 with the  small block, which used a  bore, the largest ever used in a small-block V8, with the Olds small-block standard deck and  stroke. The bore was so wide that the cylinder walls were siamesed, as in the Chevrolet 400 V8, with no space for coolant to flow between the cylinders. Additionally, the 403 had windowed main webs, which reduced the internal strength of the block in the crankcase area. It has been purported that there is a 403 Oldsmobile block and cast that has solid main webs that may have been equipped in vehicles such as the Pontiac Firebird equipped with a towing package, but there are currently no clearly documented surviving examples. 

The 403 is fundamentally the exact same block as an Oldsmobile 350 V8, however it features a larger bore. Most components and accessories are interchangeable. A popular modification made to the 403 to increase power was to swap on early Oldsmobile 350 heads to boost compression.  The 403 was never featured with a manual transmission and the crank was never manufactured for a pilot bearing. It was generally paired with the Turbo Hydramatic 350 3-speed automatic or the Turbo Hydramatic 400 3-speed ustomatic in rear wheel drive vehicles, in the case of front-wheel drive vehicles, the Turbo Hydramatic 425 FWD 3-speed automatic. It always featured the 4A 83cc heads with 8:1 compression, and a Rochester Quadrajet 4 barrel carburettor. The 403 Oldsmobile was generally painted "Corporate GM Blue" on every model line it was equipped in. 

The Olds 403 was used by Buick and Pontiac in addition to Oldsmobile until its discontinuation after 1979. Uniquely in the 1977 Toronado, the 403 engine was fitted with a crank triggered ignition system. Parts peculiar to this system include a toothed disc between the harmonic balancer and the crank pulley, the "adjacent sensor" (an early form of crankshaft position sensor), a special distributor, an engine temperature sensor, and a rudimentary computer mounted inside the car, under the dashboard. 

Applications:
1977 Buick Century Estate
1977–1978 Buick Riviera
1977–1979 Buick Electra
1977–1979 Buick Estate Wagon
1977–1979 Buick LeSabre
1977 Oldsmobile Cutlass
1977 Oldsmobile 4-4-2
1977 Oldsmobile Vista Cruiser
1977–1978 Oldsmobile Delta 88
1977–1978 Oldsmobile Toronado
1977–1979 Oldsmobile 98
1977–1979 Oldsmobile Custom Cruiser
1977 Pontiac Bonneville
1977-1979 Pontiac Catalina Safari
1977-1979 Pontiac Firebird
1977 Pontiac Grand Prix available with California Emissions Only
1977 Pontiac Can Am available with California Emissions Only
1977–1978 GMC Motorhome

260
SAE gross power was 150 hp. The 260 V8 received VIN code "F" and had a sales code of LV8. This was the first engine to use the smaller Rochester Dualjet two-barrel carburetor, the only carburetor used on the 260. Production of the 260 V8 ended in 1982 when the 307 became the only gasoline V8 in Oldsmobile's line. The 260 was designed for economy, and was the first engine option above the 4.1 ChevroletI-6, then later the 3.8 L Buick V6, which was standard fitment in many Oldsmobile models by the late 1970s. While the 260s were not very powerful compared to the larger 350 and 403 V8s, fuel economy was almost as good as the base V6. Compared to the V6, the 260 was also smoother-running, and far more durable. Most 260s were coupled to the Turbo Hydramatic 200 transmission, but a 5-speed manual transmission was also available in some vehicles. 

Applications:
1975–1977 Pontiac Ventura
1975-1977 Pontiac LeMans  
1975–1982 Oldsmobile Cutlass
1975-1977 Oldsmobile Omega
1975-1977 Buick Skylark
1977-1982 Oldsmobile 88

307
A slightly larger  version was introduced in 1980. It uses a  bore (in common with the Buick 231 V6 and 350 V8) with a  stroke. Some early 307s were painted GM Corporate blue, but most were painted satin black. It was used in most Oldsmobile models, as well as those from Buick, Cadillac, Chevrolet, and Pontiac. Every 307 used a four-barrel carburetor, which was a variant of the Rochester Quadrajet, usually the CCC (Computer Command Control) Quadrajet.

The output of the  wasn't particularly high in terms of horsepower. For example, the stock (non-high-output, VIN "Y")  in the 1983 Oldsmobile 98 was a mere , although in that year a high-output model (VIN "9") was available producing a nominal , at approximately  torque. The combination of good low-RPM torque, the Quadrajet four-barrel carburetor, and the THM-200-4R three speed plus overdrive automatic transmission having a lockup torque converter allowed for fairly good performance, and fuel economy considered reasonable for the era, even in the larger and heavier model cars. The engine is also known for its reliability, smoothness and quietness.

Applications:
1980–1985 Oldsmobile 88
1980–1984 Oldsmobile 98
1980–1985 Oldsmobile Toronado
1980–1990 Oldsmobile Custom Cruiser
1980–1985 Buick Lesabre
1980–1984 Buick Electra
1980–1985 Buick Riviera
1980–1990 Buick Estate Wagon
1986–1987 Buick Regal
1986–1990 Chevrolet Caprice Wagon
1986–1987 Cadillac Brougham VIN "9" (Includes Early Model 1988 Broughams made in 1987)
1981 Pontiac Bonneville
1986 Pontiac Parisienne The 307 was fitted in some late model 1986 Parisienne's while others had the Chevy 305

LV2
Oldsmobile used the popular LV2, a  engine, commonly known by the VIN code "Y", from 1980-1990. It was used by every domestic GM automobile marque except for GMC and Saturn. In 1985, roller lifters, floating piston wrist pins, and swirl port intake runners were added. All LV2s feature a 4-barrel carburetor.

Y-version applications:
1980–1985 Buick Lesabre
1980–1985 Buick Riviera
1986–1987 Buick Regal
1986–1990 Chevrolet Caprice
1980–1985 Oldsmobile 88
1980–1984 Oldsmobile 98
1980–1985 Oldsmobile Toronado
1980–1990 Oldsmobile Custom Cruiser
1980–1981 Oldsmobile Cutlass
1982–1987 Oldsmobile Cutlass Supreme
1988 Oldsmobile Cutlass Supreme Classic
1983–1986 Pontiac Parisienne VIN "Y"
1987-1989 Pontiac Safari
1988–1990 Cadillac Brougham VIN "Y"

LG8
The LG8 was a modern  High-Output derivative of the LV2 produced from 1983 to 1987. Performance modifications included a "hot" camshaft (in reality, just a camshaft used in various applications during the '70s with .440"/.440" lift and 196°/208° duration at .050"), stiffer valve springs, a larger vibration damper (same as all '73-'79 350s, 403s, and 455s), a Y-pipe dual-outlet exhaust system, and richer secondary metering rods in the carburetor. It was offered in the Hurst/Olds version of the Oldsmobile Cutlass Calais and in the 4-4-2 version of the Oldsmobile Cutlass Salon. Revisions to the engine for 1986 included roller lifters with a slightly smaller camshaft (.435"/.438" lift and 194°/210° duration at .050"), new heads with smaller, swirl-port intake runners, floating piston pins, and larger piston dishes for lower compression (8.0:1 v. 8.4:1).

Applications:
1983–1984 Hurst/Olds
1985–1987 Oldsmobile 4-4-2
1985–1988 Cadillac Brougham VIN "9"

Generation 3

The Generation II V8 ended production in 1990. The company later introduced a new vehicle, the Oldsmobile Aurora, with a new generation V8. Based on the Cadillac Northstar engine, this 4.0-liter engine, called Aurora, was a DOHC design with four valves per cylinder. Apart from the Oldsmobile Aurora, the Aurora V8 was also used in the Shelby Series 1. 

From the 1950s through the late 1970s, each GM division had its own V8 engine family. Many were shared among other divisions, but each design was unique:
Buick V8 engine
Cadillac V8 engine
Chevrolet Small-Block engine
Chevrolet Big-Block engine
Pontiac V8 engine
Holden V8 engine

GM later standardized on the later generations of the Chevrolet design:
GM LT engine - Generation II small-block
GM LS engine - Generation III/IV small-block
List of GM engines

See also
Oldsmobile straight-6 engine
Oldsmobile straight-8 engine
Oldsmobile Diesel engine

References

V8
V8 engines